The Revolutionary Rivalry is a rivalry between the George Mason Patriots and George Washington Colonials, both of which play in the Atlantic 10 Conference and are located in the Washington metropolitan area. Both schools are named after founding fathers, George Mason and George Washington, who were both natives to Virginia and had their plantations, Gunston Hall and Mount Vernon, respectively, on the southside of modern Fairfax County.

The rivalry is balanced in terms of total wins between each school across all sports. George Washington, though, has historically dominated the series in men's and women's basketball, while George Mason has dominated the series in baseball and men's and women's soccer.

History 
The formal rivalry, with the title, "Revolutionary Rivalry" is rooted ahead of the 2013–14 academic school year, when George Mason University left the Colonial Athletic Association to join the Atlantic 10 Conference, as part of the 2010–2014 NCAA conference realignment. Before then, both institutions regularly played non-conference matches against each other due to relative proximity of the schools (separated by 20 miles).

Historically, most of the rivalry, even prior to the Patriots joining the A-10 was fixed on basketball, which has historically favored the Colonials However, with both schools being part of the Atlantic 10, the rivalry was formally given a title, and spanned across all sports.

All-time series summary 

Series led and games won by George Mason are shaded ██ green. Series led and games won by George Washington shaded ██ blue.

Series results 
The formal rivalry began during the 2013-14 season when Mason joined the Atlantic 10 Conference.

The point system is that there is one point awarded per win, and split half-a-point if it ends in a tie in head-to-head team sports. This includes soccer, volleyball, basketball, tennis and lacrosse. In baseball and softball, a point is awarded to whichever team wins the series, since these sports are played in three-game series over the course of the regular season. In individual, non head-to-head sports, a point is awarded to the team that finishes higher in the Atlantic 10 Championship. These sports are cross country, swimming, golf, and rowing.

Below is a summary of winners since the point system began.

See also 
George Mason University
George Washington University

References

External links 
Revolutionary Rivalry

College basketball rivalries in the United States
College sports rivalries in the United States
College sports in Virginia
College sports in Washington, D.C.
George Mason Patriots
George Washington Colonials
2013 establishments in Virginia
2013 establishments in Washington, D.C.